The physics technical term massive particle refers to a massful particle which has real non-zero rest mass (such as baryonic matter), the counter-part to the term massless particle. According to special relativity, the velocity of a massive particle is always less than the speed of light.
are sometimes used to contrast with luxon (which moves at light speed) and hypothetical tachyon (which moves faster than light).

Dark matter
Types of massive particles include weakly interacting and stable massive particles, which are hypothesized to constitute dark matter.

See also

 Elementary particle
 Massless particle
 Particle
 Tachyon

References

Particle physics